Schopf is a surname. Notable people with the surname include:
 Alessandro Schöpf (born 1994), Austrian footballer
 Andreas Schopf (born 1984), Austrian luger
 Christian Schopf (born 1983), Austrian luger
 Daniel Schöpf (born 1990), Austrian footballer
 Thomas Schopf (born 1989), Austrian luger
 Wolfgang Schopf (born 1988), Austrian luger
 J. William Schopf (born 1941), American paleontologist